Jean-Claude Theillière (born 23 May 1944) is a former French racing cyclist. He won the French national road race title in 1966.

References

External links

1944 births
Living people
French male cyclists
Sportspeople from Puy-de-Dôme